Stringin' Along With Chet Atkins is the second studio album recorded by American guitarist Chet Atkins on the RCA Victor label. It was available as a 10-inch vinyl record. RCA subsequently released it as a 12-inch [LP] in 1955 with additional and omitted tracks.

The song "Main Street Breakdown" had been released as a single in 1949 and was a minor success. Chet commented in his autobiography, "It had a lot of notes and fast runs and DJs apparently loved it." Homer & Jethro played on the song with Anita Carter playing bass.

Reception

Track listing
The gold cover release had a different track listing and order, substituting "12th Street Rag" for "Boogie Man Boogie"

 "Blue Gypsy" (Atkins, Boudleaux Bryant) – 2:19
 "Oh by Jingo!" (Lew Brown, Albert Von Tilzer) – 2:14
 "Hello Ma Baby" (Joseph Howard, Ida Emerson) – 2:09
 "Memphis Blues" (W. C. Handy, George Norton) – 2:11
 "Alice Blue Gown" (Joseph McCarthy, Harry Tierney) – 2:06
 "Indian Love Call" (Rudolf Friml, Oscar Hammerstein, Otto Harbach) – 2:39
 "Main Street Breakdown" (Atkins) – 2:18
 "Boogie Man Boogie" (Atkins) – 2:49

It was also released under the same title with the red cover as a two-disc gatefold 45 rpm EP (RCA EPB-1236) with a different track listing.

Disc 1:
Side 1 - "Oh, By Jingo!" / "Indian Love Call"
Side 2 - "Memphis Blues" / "12th Street Rag"
Disc 2:
Side 1 - "Gallopin' Guitar" / "St. Louis Blues"
Side 2 - "Alice Blue Gown" / "The Third Man Theme"

A gold cover 45rpm gatefold set EPB-3163 was released in the 1950s containing,

EPB-3163

Disc 1:
Side 1 - "Oh, By Jingo!" / "Indian Love Call"
Side 2 - "Memphis Blues" / "Twelfth Street Rag"
Disc 2:
Side 1 - "Main Street Breakdown" / "Hello Ma Baby"
Side 2 - "Alice Blue Gown" / "Blue Gypsy"

Personnel
Chet Atkins – guitar

References

1953 albums
Chet Atkins albums
Albums produced by Steve Sholes
RCA Victor albums